2009 Men's European Volleyball Championship was held from September 3 to September 13, 2009 in İzmir and Istanbul, Turkey.

Poland claimed their first Men's European Volleyball Championship title with an undefeated run. The final was concluded with a 3-1 victory against France. Bulgaria captured the bronze medal after defeating Russia 3-0. Poland's Piotr Gruszka was named the tournament's most valuable player.

Venues

The İzmir Halkapınar Sport Hall in İzmir hosted Pools A, C, and E. Istanbul's Abdi İpekçi Arena hosted Pools B, D, and F. İzmir also hosted the Semifinals & Final.

Qualification

 Host
 
 Directly qualified after 2007 Men's European Volleyball Championship
 
 
 
 
 
 
 Qualified through qualification tournament
 
 
 
 
 
 
 Qualified through additional qualification tournament

Squads

Pools composition

Preliminary round

Pool A

|}

Pool B

|}

Pool C

|}

Pool D

|}

Playoff round

Pool E

|}

Pool F

|}

Final round

Semifinals

3rd place

Final

Final standing

Awards

Most Valuable Player
  Piotr Gruszka
Best Scorer
  Antonin Rouzier
Best Spiker
  Aleksandr Volkov
Best Blocker
  Viktor Yosifov
Best Server
  Yury Berezhko
Best Setter
  Paweł Zagumny
Best Receiver
  Stéphane Antiga
Best Libero
  Hubert Henno

External links
Official Website

Men's European Volleyball Championships
European Championship
European 2009
Mens European Volleyball Championship, 2009
Sports competitions in Istanbul
Sports competitions in Izmir
2000s in Istanbul
2000s in İzmir